Israel Puerto Pineda (born 15 June 1993) is a Spanish professional footballer who plays as a central defender for Polish club Jagiellonia Białystok.

Club career
Born in El Viso del Alcor, Province of Seville, Andalusia, Puerto joined Sevilla FC's youth system at the age of 12. Four years later, he almost quit football due to a cardiovascular disease from which he eventually recovered fully.

Puerto spent his first seasons as a senior with the reserve team, competing in Segunda División B. On 10 March 2013, he scored a brace against Arroyo CP in a 3–0 home win, and, on 28 April, he made his official debut with the main squad, coming on as an 87th-minute substitute for José Antonio Reyes in a 1–1 La Liga draw at Real Valladolid.

On 2 July 2014, Puerto moved to another reserve side, Villarreal CF B also of the third division. He made his debut with the first team on 4 December, starting in a 2–1 away win against Cádiz CF in the round of 32 of the Copa del Rey.

On 4 March 2015, Puerto was transferred to Segunda División club CD Lugo, signing a -year deal as a replacement for injured Jon García. In his debut, three days later, he scored his first professional goal, netting his team's first in the 3–2 home victory over FC Barcelona B.

Puerto then returned to the Spanish third tier, representing in quick succession Racing de Santander, CD Mirandés and Recreativo de Huelva. The 26-year-old moved abroad for the first time in June 2019, signing with Śląsk Wrocław of the Polish Ekstraklasa.

International career
Puerto won his only cap for the Spain under-21 team on 9 September 2014, playing 54 minutes in the 1–1 home draw against Austria for the 2015 UEFA European Championship qualifiers held in Puertollano.

Club statistics

References

External links

1993 births
Living people
People from Campiña de Carmona
Sportspeople from the Province of Seville
Spanish footballers
Footballers from Andalusia
Association football defenders
La Liga players
Segunda División players
Segunda División B players
Sevilla Atlético players
Sevilla FC players
Villarreal CF B players
Villarreal CF players
CD Lugo players
Racing de Santander players
CD Mirandés footballers
Recreativo de Huelva players
Ekstraklasa players
Śląsk Wrocław players
Jagiellonia Białystok players
Spain youth international footballers
Spain under-21 international footballers
Spanish expatriate footballers
Expatriate footballers in Poland
Spanish expatriate sportspeople in Poland